Daniel Clark McElroy (born July 15, 1948) is an American politician and former public official in the state of Minnesota.

Public sector career
McElroy served as Mayor of Burnsville from 1987 to 1995 and on the Burnsville City Council from 1983 to 1987.  In the private sector, he spent 23 years running travel agencies and travel agency software and consulting companies. 

He served in the Minnesota House of Representatives from 1995 until 2003. He became Chief of Staff to Governor Tim Pawlenty from 2004 through 2005 and Commissioner of Finance in 2003 and 2004. From 2007 to 2010 he was the Commissioner of the Minnesota Department of Employment and Economic Development.
He became President and CEO of Hospitality Minnesota in 2011, a coalition that includes the Minnesota Restaurant, Lodging, and Resort & Campground Associations.

Business career
McElroy served as a trustee of the Minnesota State Colleges and Universities, a system with 7 four year colleges and 25 community and technical colleges.  He chaired the committees on Finance and Academic and Student Affairs during his tenure as a Trustee. He was the Chair of the Public Facilities Authority. The authority has approximately $3 billion in assets and initiates about $400 million in loans each year. He chaired of the Jobs Skills Partnership Board. 

 Chair of the Agriculture and Economic     Development Loan Board, a state program that finances job creating     business expansions and acts as a conduit bond issuance entity for     non-profit organizations.  The Board     has assets of about $30 million and has completed bond transactions of     about $1 billion since 2003.
 Chair of the Minnesota Science and     Technology Authority charged with developing and implementing an     economic development strategy for science and technology oriented     industries, including the commercialization of University research.
 Chair of the Urban Initiative Program,     a micro lending facility that provides capital to start up, usually     minority owned businesses in low income neighborhoods.  The program initiates about 25 loans a     year through 13 community partners.      Loans range from $5,000 to $100,000.
 Member of the Environmental     Quality Board, the Mining and Forestry Sub Cabinets, the Next Generation     Energy Board, the Ultra-High-Speed Broadband Task Force and the Continuous     Improvement Sub Cabinet.

References

21st-century American politicians
Chiefs of staff to United States state governors
Republican Party members of the Minnesota House of Representatives
1948 births
Living people